Danny Hibbert (born 16 November 1948) is a former Australian rules footballer who played for Collingwood in the Victorian Football League (VFL).

Hibbert was at Collingwood for three seasons. During the 1969 VFL season, he scored five goals in a win over Geelong. Later, in the 1970s, he played with Dandenong and won the J. J. Liston Trophy in 1976.

References

Holmesby, Russell and Main, Jim (2007). The Encyclopedia of AFL Footballers. 7th ed. Melbourne: Bas Publishing.

1948 births
Living people
Collingwood Football Club players
Dandenong Football Club players
J. J. Liston Trophy winners
Montmorency Football Club players
Australian rules footballers from Victoria (Australia)